Luxury Cabin is a 1959 Spanish comedy film directed by Rafael Gil and starring Antonio Casal, María Mahor and Fernando Sancho.

Synopsis 
A young man leaves his town and goes to the capital, La Coruña, to work with a relative in an emigration shipping company. He soon discovers that the boss extorts the emigrants he sells tickets to and even tries to steal the papers from one of them. But he, who is an honest and sensitive man, cannot consent to such injustice and returns the papers to the emigrant so that he can embark so that he ends up being fired with no money and without finding a job and without telling him or anyone about what happened. His parents or his girlfriend, he makes the decision to embark as a stowaway on a ship that goes to America.

Cast
Antonio Casal as Aurelio Romay 
María Mahor as Guadalupe  
Fernando Sancho as Ernesto 
José Marco Davó as Don Fabián Mouriz  
Mercedes Muñoz Sampedro as Doña Sofía  
Rafael Bardem as Don Jacinto  
Carmen Esbrí as Vedette 
 as Aurelio's father
Carmen Rodríguez as Aurelio's mother 
Juan Vázquez as Don Manuel  
Nelly Morelli as Elvira  
Guillermo Hidalgo as official 
Adela Carboné as Maria's aunt 
Celia Foster as María  
Ángel Álvarez as godfather  
 as godmother  
Eumedre as Juan Cadaval  
Manolo Morán as Don Armando 
Julia Caba Alba as dizzy woman  
Pilar Gómez Ferrer as lady on the train 
Manuel Requena as Don Vicente

References

External links

1959 comedy films
Spanish comedy films
Films directed by Rafael Gil
1950s Spanish films